The Complete Columbia Album Collection may refer to:
 Johnny Cash: The Complete Columbia Album Collection
 Miles Davis: The Complete Columbia Album Collection
 Blue Öyster Cult: The Complete Columbia Album Collection